To rip is the act of tearing an object.

Rip may also refer to:

Places
 7711 Říp, an asteroid
 Říp Mountain, a mountain in the Czech Republic
 Rip Point, South Shetland Islands, Antarctica
 The Rip, entrance to Port Phillip from Bass Strait in Victoria, Australia

People
 Rip (given name)
 Rip (nickname)
 Rip (surname)
 Rip, pseudonym of the French revue writer Georges Gabriel Thenon
 Rip Hawk, ring name of American professional wrestler Harvey Maurice Evers
 Rip Morgan, ring name of New Zealand professional wrestler Michael Morgan (born 1957)
 Rip Oliver, ring name of American professional wrestler Larry Richard Oliver
 Rip Rogers, ring name of American professional wrestler Mark Sciarra (born 1954)
 Rip Sawyer, ring name of American professional wrestler Sidney F. Garrison (fl. 1980s-1990s)
 H. Ripley Rawlings IV (known as Rip), American author of military fiction

Arts, entertainment, and media

Fictional characters
 Rip Clutchgoneski, a World Grand Prix racecar from the fictional country of Republic of New Rearendia, character in the film Cars 2
 Rip Hunter, a DC Comics character
 Rip Kirby, title character of the detective comic strip
Rip Thomas, movie name for Hulk Hogan in the movie No Holds Barred (1989)
 Rip Van Winkle, title character of the eponymous story by Washington Irving

Music
 Rip, in music, a type of glissando
 "The Rip" (song), a 2008 single by Portishead
 The Rip, a former band of New Zealand musician Alastair Galbraith (musician)

Other uses in arts, entertainment, and media
 RiP!: A Remix Manifesto, a 2008 documentary about remixing and intellectual property
 Ripping, the process of copying audio or video from removable media to a hard disk

Ships
Rip, originally HMQS Paluma, an Australian gunboat scrapped in the 1950s
Rip, the name from 1947-1984 of HMAS Whyalla (J153), a decommissioned Australian corvette

Other uses
 Rip (dog), a Second World War search-and-rescue dog awarded the Dickin Medal for bravery
 Raster image processor, which is used for printing software

See also

 Rip current or rip tide, a strong surface flow of water returning seaward from near the shore
 Rip cut, severing or dividing a piece of wood parallel to the grain
 
 
 RIPD (disambiguation)
 Rips (disambiguation)
 Ripped (disambiguation)
 Ripper (disambiguation)
 Ryp (disambiguation)